The Neville Island Bridge is a tied arch bridge which carries Interstate 79 and the Yellow Belt across the Ohio River and over Neville Island, west of Pittsburgh, Pennsylvania.

Construction
Opening in 1976, after five years of construction, the Neville Island Bridge was the last link to finish on the 180 mile long I-79. It is also the second longest single spanning bridge in Allegheny County. The engineers who built it were the Pennsylvania Department of Transportation (PennDot), making it with a 125' arch.

Problems
In 1977, a crack was discovered in the bridge.  The bridge was immediately closed to traffic and remained closed until repairs could be performed.  It was determined that the crack was not due to poor bridge design, but due to a failed weld.

Improvements
During 2010 PennDot completed a $20.8 million improvement of I-79, Neville Island Bridge as well as other intersections.

A new restoration project formally began in August of 2021; lane closures had been in effect on the northbound lanes since June. PennDOT contracted The Trumbull Corporation to complete the repairs at a cost of $43 million USD. Renovations include structural steel repairs, full structure painting, bearing and deck joint replacements, deck repairs and overlays, bridge barrier repair, substructure concrete work and drainage improvements. Work on the southbound lanes is expected to commence in 2022. The project includes long-term closure of the entrance ramp to  I-79 from Grand Avenue, detoured via Neville Island, the Coraopolis Bridge, Pennsylvania Route 51 South, and to Exit 64. The on ramp has since reopened.

See also
List of crossings of the Ohio River

References

Bridges over the Ohio River
Bridges completed in 1976
Tied arch bridges in the United States
Bridges in Allegheny County, Pennsylvania
Road bridges in Pennsylvania
Interstate 79
Bridges on the Interstate Highway System
1976 establishments in Pennsylvania
Steel bridges in the United States